The Japanese adult visual novel Fate/stay night features a number of characters created by Type-Moon, some of whom are classified as Servants with special combat abilities. The characters listed have appeared mainly in two anime television series adaptations (Fate/stay night and Fate/stay night: Unlimited Blade Works) with a movie trilogy adaptation (Fate/stay night: Heaven's Feel) produced by Studio Deen and Ufotable respectively. A Fate/stay night: Unlimited Blade Works animated film was released prior to its TV series.

Main characters

Shirou Emiya

Shirou is a good-hearted and honest teenager who always enjoys helping others. However, Shirō is a deeply scarred human being orphaned after a fire destroyed part of his hometown when he was seven and caused him to lose all memory of the first seven years of his life. He was saved by Kiritsugu Emiya, who adopted him and named him Shirō after discovering that the boy could not recall his real name. He has no interest in the Holy Grail and instead despises it. However, he is determined to win the Holy Grail War with Saber, for he hopes his efforts will ensure that another disaster like the Fuyuki fire will never occur again. The main plot of Fate/stay night focuses on his ideal and the three different ways he approaches it.

Saber

The main heroine of the Fate route and the mascot of the franchise, Saber is an honorable swordsman whose true identity is the King of Knights  who sought the Holy Grail to prevent the events that doomed her homeland with someone else ruling Britain in her stead. She was previously Kiritsugu's servant during the Fourth Holy Grail War, serving as Irisviel's bodyguard while questioning her master's tactics before being forced into attempting to destroy the Holy Grail. Losing her memory in the process, Saber becomes Shirō's Servant for the Fifth Holy Grail War. Saber acts coldly and suppressing her emotions to focus on her goals. Saber is frustrated by Shirō's "protective" tendencies, believing his erratic and reckless behavior will jeopardize their chances of winning the Holy Grail War services as a Heroic Spirit.
Stunned to discover that the legendary King Arthur is a young woman, Kiritsugu refused to speak to her directly since her summoning, which Saber initially believes is because he believes the fact that she is a woman makes her inadequate. However, Irisviel later suggests Kiritsugu's anger towards Saber is out of the belief that he could not accept the decisions Saber made or allowed to be made in life yet he could not justify his reasons for why he believed she was wrong.

Rin Tohsaka

The main heroine of the UBW route, Rin Tohsaka is a high school girl who barely talks to other students in her school and exhibits a desire to be left alone, as exemplified by her tendency to stay on the school's rooftop, away from the rest students. She is also secretly a Mage, and a Master in the Fifth Holy Grail War. Rin is reared as the successor to her family's magecraft, instructed by her father, Tokiomi Tohsaka, to prioritize sorcery over her own interests. When she was young, Rin was separated from her sister Sakura, who was given to the Matou family for adoption. After her father is killed in the Fourth Holy Grail War, Rin perfects her sorcery with some guidance from her guardian, Kirei Kotomine.

Sakura Matou

The main heroine of the Heaven's feel route, Sakura is a first-year high school student and the sister of Shinji Matou. After Shirou's father, Kiritsugu, died, Sakura often visits Shirou's home to help him with his daily chores. Though Shinji is from a sorcerer family, he asserts that she does not know her family's craft or history. Sakura is outwardly timid but possesses great magical strength. She has a long-standing crush on Shirou Emiya. Sakura plays a minor part in the Fate and Unlimited Blade Works routes, being nothing more than a dutiful kouhai (junior student) who is always there to help Shirou in both routes. However, in the Heaven's Feel route, she serves as the lead heroine and vastly expands on her backstory. In the anime-original storyline,  Sakura is kidnapped by Caster as a sacrifice to summon the Holy Grail due to her possessing latent magic circuits. During the rescue attempt, she and Rin are confirmed to be sisters who were separated when they were very young.

Kiritsugu Emiya

 is Shirō's adoptive father who died before the events of Fate/stay night and is only seen in flashback and the protagonist of Fate/Zero, known as the Mage Slayer for his unconventional methods of killing. Born in Fuyuki City, Kiritsugu was raised on Alimango Island by his father Norikata Emiya, a magus who specializes in time magic. But Kiritsugu‘s life took a nasty turn when her friend Shirley, a local girl working as his father's aide, accidentally got vampirized and his hesitance to kill her resulted in the entire island being comprised. Marrying into the Einzbern family, Kiritsugu served as their representative in the Fourth Holy War as Saber's Master during the Fourth Holy Grail War with the intention of using the Holy Grail to wish for world peace. But Kiritsugu discovered that the Grail had become corrupted and attempted to destroy it by using a Command Spell on Saber which devastated the surrounding area, inflicted with a curse that shorted his lifespan and raising Shirō after being cast out by the Einzbern family.

Irisviel von Einzbern

 is the main heroine of the story and Kiritsugu's wife. She is a homunculus prototype created by the Einzbern family with the idea of giving birth to an ultimate homunculus.  Like many of the Einzberns, she is skilled in alchemy.  Irisviel serves as Saber's proxy Master, since Kiritsugu believes that he and Saber are incompatible. Due to possessing the inborn knowledge and reasoning of homunculi, hindsights gleaned from the 1000 years of history of the Einzbern as well only having nine years of life-experience, she has both the elegance of a lady and the innocence of a child. Her true purpose in the War is as the vessel of the Holy Grail itself. When four or more Servants are killed, she will manifest as the Grail, losing fully her humanity and sense of self in the process.
Created by Jubstacheit von Einzbern, the eighth head of the Einzbern family, she originally saw herself only as a tool to summon the Holy Grail. Upon first contact with Irisviel in the Einzbern residence in Germany, Kiritsugu noted that she had no instinct for self-preservation and expressed doubts about Irisviel's suitability as the Grail to Jubstacheit. In response, Jubstacheit threw Irisviel into a junkyard for rejected homunculi, a dangerous place filled with monsters and spirits, reasoning that if Irisviel could not even survive a night there alone, he would accept Kiritsugu's criticism and furnish him a new homunculi. In response, Kiritsugu rescued Irisviel and decided to give her a sense of self-preservation by personally educating her and teaching her what it meant to be a human. Eventually, they fell in love with each other. Wanting to show Kiritsugu that there could be a future for them after her fated death, she bears Kiritsugu a daughter, Illyasviel von Einzbern. They live together for nine years in total before departing to Japan for the War.
While approving of Kiritsugu's ideal and willing to sacrifice herself for its sake, she does not truly understand that ideal, but only wishes to walk the same path as her beloved. However, in order not to burden Kiritsugu, she decides to behave as a woman who would die for that same ideal rather than a woman that would die for her husband. Her Magecraft involves the creation and forging of matter, as well as its applications. In terms of magical ability, she is stronger than Kiritsugu. Her weapons are thin, long and flexible wires, which she uses to produce an instantaneous homunculus with alchemy that attacks the enemy while changing itself into numerous shapes. She may also use her weapon to immobilize her target.

Major Characters

 - 

Archer is the Servant of Rin Tōsaka, and he serves as the servant protagonist of the Unlimited Blade Works route, but he also serves an antagonistic role for part of the route. He is sarcastic and cynical, considering Shirō's "wanting to save everyone" mentality as naïve and impossible. Archer's real identity is Shirō Emiya from one of the possible future worlds. He is the winner of the Fifth Holy Grail War in his world. Later, Archer made a pact with the world to gain more power to pursue his goal of becoming "the ally of justice," indiscriminately killing all "evil" people regardless of their circumstances or what may result from their deaths. He was eventually framed for starting a war by an unknown group and executed by the fearful public. Unlike the other Servants, Archer is a Counter Guardian, a supernatural being who resides outside time and space. The Counter Guardians have one mission; to stop any event that would cause humanity's extinction by killing everyone involved. This life of endless killing drove Archer mad with grief, and he sought to end his eternal existence and return to nothingness. The jewel Archer owns is the actual catalyst used for his summoning rather than the one Rin still has at the time of his summoning. He has taken the basics of magic to their absolute maximum to combat-ready, creating a small but reliable skillset for himself. Though Projection is normally ineffective at creating durable or powerful artifacts, Archer's unique approach to this craft enables him to materialize enormously powerful and accurate copies of the images recorded in his mind. All of his Projection abilities come from his Reality Marble, which manifests itself instead as a desert littered with swords with monolithic black gears rotating in the smog-filled sky above.

In the Fate route, he is defeated by Berserker while buying time for Rin, Shirō, and Saber to escape. In the Unlimited Blade Works route, after Shirō refuses to abandon the ideal to save everyone, Archer seeks to kill Shirō to prevent him from becoming like himself and ending his own existence as a Counter Guardian. Shirō defeats him later but survives long enough to deliver the finishing blow to Gilgamesh and save Rin and Shinji from the Grail's birth canal. In the "Heaven's Feel" route, Shirō chooses to save Sakura over society at large, effectively abandoning his "allies of justice" idealism. Archer's dream is fulfilled, and he continues his mission to protect Shirō and his friends. Later, Archer is mortally wounded in an engagement against True Assassin, Saber Alter, and The Shadow. He survives long enough to have Kirei Kotomine surgically graft his left arm onto Shirō, who lost his arm in that same battle.

 - . 

Rider is Shinji's servant, first seen scouting around Shirō's school. Her true identity is Medusa, the gorgon-witch of legend remembered as one of its infamous monsters. Rider is silent, sultry, and vigilant, never hesitating to shield her Master from harm. She employs covert battle tactics and takes full advantage of her surroundings. With Shinji incapable of lending Mana to her, she is forced to seek alternative means to augment her abilities, such as putting magical seals all over Fuyuki High School that, when activated, drain the life out of any living creature within. It is one of her Noble Phantasms, . Her weapon of choice is a pair of long iron nails fastened to opposite ends of a single chain, which she effectively thrusts from distances. It drives the Pegasus into a killing fury, turning the Pegasus' charge into a wave of energy capable of causing mass destruction. She wears a blindfold, actually, another Noble Phantasm, which seals away her powerful Mystic Eyes, the  that are capable of paralyzing any weaker being who looks at her, instantly turning others into stone. However, in Fate/hollow ataraxia and the True End of Heaven's Feel, she is seen wearing glasses that supplant her blindfold as a seal for her eyes.

Rider is the initial antagonist alongside Shinji and is ultimately defeated by Saber. In the manga adaptation of Fate/Stay night, Rider survives to save her master. In the Unlimited Blade Works route, Rider's role is much briefer as she only engages Shirō once before Caster's master later kills her.

In Heaven's Feel, Sakura, the heroine of the route, is revealed to be the true Master of Rider, thus making Rider the servant protagonist of Heaven's Feel. Rider seeks to protect Sakura despite her murderous deeds due to sharing a kinship with her. After Shirō breaks his alliance with Rin to protect Sakura, Rider effectively replaces his lost Servant Saber as the guardian of the Emiya household. In the endgame, Shirō and Rider defeat Saber Alter and allow Shirō to save Sakura. Rider then carries an unconscious Sakura and a gravely-injured Rin to safety while Shirō ensures the Holy Grail's destruction. While her ultimate fate in the Normal End is not known, the True End depicts Rider surviving the war and remaining in the world without the Grail due to Sakura's massive mana-stores, living peacefully with Shirō and Sakura. Rider is also revealed to have latent feelings for Shirō due to him being the first male to treat her with kindness.

A young Teutonic aristocrat who travels to Japan to participate in the Fifth Holy Grail War as the Master of Berserker. She lives in a castle on the outskirts of Fuyuki City, accompanied only by her Servant and her two maids Leysritt and Sella. In the prequel, Fate/Zero, it is established that Illya is the daughter of Kiritsugu Emiya and Irisviel von Einzbern. Illya was then raised to believe her father abandoned her, not knowing that he actually wanted to save her from the Grail's fate. Illya's desire to learn more about the person Kiritsugu raised in his final years instead of her prompts Illya to observe Shirō in some cases or try to take him like possession in others. However, she starts warming up after getting to know him when he treats her kindly despite her prior attempts to kill him. She is a homunculus like her mother, created to serve as the vessel of the Holy Grail. In the Fate route, she serves as the antagonist for the second part of the arc with her servant Berserker as she takes Shirō hostage, torn between wanting to take revenge on him in place of Kiritsugu for her years alone or trying to convince him into being a willing possession of hers to care for. Working together, Saber and Shirō managed to defeat Berserker. When Shirō takes her in after this, she is finally convinced that his concern for her is genuine, and she lives peacefully with Shirō after her Servant is defeated. However, none of them know that Illya will soon die, her homunculus' nature having been designed to survive only up to one year after the Fifth Holy Grail War's conclusion. In the Unlimited Blade Works route, she is a minor antagonist; she anticipates meeting with Rin and Shirō as they seek an alliance against Caster when the Servant captures Saber. Still, Illya's own desire to toy with them and stall their approach for her amusement backfires as it leaves her with only Berserker to defend her when Gilgamesh comes after her. After a brutal battle in which Gilgamesh defeats her servant, Illya ultimately dies weeping over the dying body of Berserker. Illya has a greatly expanded role in the Heaven's Feel, and she takes a much more active sisterly role for Shirō early on, helping him through the war and being saved from the Shadow twice over by Shirō. She eventually sacrifices herself to save Shirō and close the Great Holy Grail in the True End.

A priest who acts as the supposedly impartial overseer of the Holy Grail War under an agreement between the Mages' Association and the Holy Church, inheriting the position from his father Risei Kotomine, before taking over the position. Due to his experience as an elite assassin for the Church, Kirei is an expert practitioner in Chinese martial arts whose expertise is magnified by his monstrous physical strength and numerous Command Seals.  Despite his strong morality, Kirei learned early in his youth that he could only experience joy through others' suffering and attempted to find peace through marriage. But it ultimately failed when his wife committed suicide to prevent him from taking his own life, realizing only later that he mourned over not killing her himself.

In Fate/Zero, Kirei became an apprentice of Tokiomi Tōsaka during the Fourth Holy Grail War at his father's behest to serve as Tokiomi's spy through his Assassin servant. But Gilgamesh incites Kirei to embrace his dark desires by secretly murdering Tokiomi Tōsaka to obtain the Archer servant as his partner while becoming Rin's guardian after her mother was declared mentally unfit, seeking the Holy Grail's power for meaning in his life. Kirei also gained a compulsive hatred towards Kiritsugu Emiya for his similarities yet placing his ideals before himself. Kirei was also responsible for using the Holy Grail to cause the fire that killed Shirō's biological parents after Kiritsugu shot him. Following his revival by the Holy Grail, he organizes the Fifth Holy Grail War to supply the Grail's curse with enough energy to be unleashed on humanity.

In Fate, after kidnapping Ilya to use her as a vessel for the Grail's cursed contents, he partakes in a climactic battle with Shirō, who ultimately kills him by destroying his heart with the Azoth Sword. In Unlimited Blade Works, he tries to use Rin as the vessel for the Grail's cursed contents after Gilgamesh killed Illya and stole her heart prior but is killed by Lancer before the climax. In the final route, Heaven's Feel, he serves as both a protagonist and one of the story's primary antagonists. By prolonging Sakura Matō's life  and facilitating her growth as the Black Grail, he plays a crucial role in ensuring her corruption by Angra Mainyu. However, his plans are foiled when Shiro and Rin manage to convince her she is truly loved, thereby giving her the resolve to break free of the entity's hold. As the fully developed Angra Mainyu prepares to enter the world, a mortally wounded Kirei surfaces to prevent Shirou from getting in its way. Subsequently, the two engage in a brutal fight to the death. Accepting defeat, he dies standing upon declaring Shirō the winner of the Fifth Holy Grail War.

Gilgamesh is an Archer Class Heroic Spirit who calls himself the King of Heroes, having a severe and sadistic God complex while treating all others as "mongrels" that are not worthy of laying eyes on him. He initially disliked Saber for being a king like himself, but developed an overt but unrequited lust for her from his desire to shatter her resolve. Gilgamesh was previously in the service of Tokiomi Tōsaka before arranging his death by his partner Kirei Kotomine. In the aftermath of the Fuyuki fire, Gilgamesh is bestowed with a physical body by Angra Mainyu and spends the next ten years hiding and feeding off the energy of half-dead orphans before resurfacing during the Fifth Holy Grail War. 
He easily defeats Caster when he makes himself known to Shirō Emiya and the others in the Fate route of the visual novel.
Gilgamesh serves as a primary antagonist in the first two routes while playing only a minor role in the third. In Fate, Saber killed him at the grounds of the Ryūdō Temple in a fierce battle. In Unlimited Blade Works, he plans to create a second Uruk using Angra Mainyu to purge most of the world's human population. His arrogance leads him to be defeated by Shirō, after which he is dragged into the dying Holy Grail just as Shirō is about to deal a fatal blow. Archer then kills him as he attempts to use Shirō to pull himself out of the Holy Grail, falling back into it and being dissolved. In Heaven's Feel, Sakura defeated and consumes Gilgamesh after a brief fight.

Supporting characters

She is an English teacher at Shirō's school, homeroom instructor of Shirō's class, and the supervising teacher for the archery dojo. She is widely called , a nickname she dislikes, but Shirō calls her "Fuji-nee" (older sister Fuji). After Kiritsugu passes away, Taiga becomes Shirō's guardian and has been living with him for several years. Taiga and Shirō are very close, and she regards him as a younger brother. She is also a skilled swordswoman, wielding a shinai known as the Tora-Shinai that was jokingly said to have absorbed so much bloodlust that it has become a high-level cursed object. She has a grandfather named Raiga.

Issei is the Student Body President of Shirō's school, and another close friend of Shirō. Issei often asks Shirō to fix broken equipment for the Student Body to save money on school expenses. Issei and Shirō often have lunch together in the Student Body office where they talk about whatever comes to mind. His father is the head priest of Ryūdō Temple, and his brother was a classmate of Taiga and Neko-san.

Sakura Matou's older brother and a long-time friend of Shirou until Shirou discovered Shinji beating Sakura, at which point Shirou beat Shinji within an inch of his life. Shinji is very popular as vice-captain of the archery dojo despite being chauvinistic and a narcissist. Like Rin Tohsaka, he is of a distinguished lineage of Japanese sorcerers (though his family is originally from Russia), though the Matou blood has thinned and no longer produces heirs naturally capable of sorcery. Shinji feels uncomfortable with his sister's daily visits to Shirou's home. He has an open crush on Rin, but she does not return his feelings.

He participates in the Fifth Holy Grail War as a Master, with Rider as his Servant, although he does not have Mage abilities. He is beaten and humiliated by Shirou, who almost crushes Shinji's throat for using the school as a power source. He has a Command Seal created by his younger sister, who is Rider's true Master. In the Fate route, after Rider loses to Saber, his book burns up; he flees but is killed by Berserker. In the Unlimited Blade Works route, he is implanted with the heart of Illya, the seed of the Holy Grail by Gilgamesh, but is later rescued by Rin Tohsaka and ultimately survives. In the Heaven's Feel route, he is ousted as a false Master as Rider returns to her true Master, Sakura. It is revealed that he had been raping Sakura for many years. He threatens to expose this to Shirō and in a fit of fright, Sakura murders Shinji.

 
Kuzuki is an instructor in Rin's class. Kuzuki is well respected among staff and students. He is a highly trained assassin who has no qualms about letting his servant Caster, whom he loves, do whatever she wants, even if the actions are considered evil. He has been staying at Issei Ryoudou's place for three years and is regarded by Issei as a brother. In the anime and the "Unlimited Blade Works" route of the visual novel, he has Caster enhance the power of his fists. In the Unlimited Blade Works route, in which he is revealed as Caster's Master, whom she made a contract with after killing her original Master (known in the anime as Atram Galiast). After his Servant is killed by Archer's hail of swords, he is defeated in melee by Archer. In the Heaven's Feel route, Kuzuki is never seen but is described as having been killed by unknown means during the Shadow's attack on the temple, with Saber and Shirō arriving soon after to find Caster standing over his dead body in shock. Caster is shown as having gone mad with grief over his death and denoting that she might as well have killed him with her own hands if this outcome was the result of him being her Master, ultimately being killed by Saber in the ensuing fight. The Fate anime adaptation depicts him dying at Gilgamesh's hands.

Zōken is a powerful, ancient magus and the patriarch of the Matō family, his methods of training being sadistic in nature. Originally from Russian, he is one of the three Magi that set up the Holy Grail System and Command Seals while prolonging his life using parasitic Crest Worms. Having amassed an enormous wealth of knowledge and experience, Zōken conceals his true nature by masquerading as a relative of his descendants by having Shinji and Sakura refer to him as their grandfather. During the events of Fate/Zero, after Kariya turned his back on their family with Bakuya and Shinji, Zōken adopted Sakura to reinvigorate his bloodline and exploits Kariya's reaction to this to ha represent their family in the Fourth Holy Grail War with expectation of his failure. Serving as the antagonist of the Heaven's Feel, Zōken initially controlled Dark Sakura before she obliterated his body, reducing him to a single worm. After seeing Illya in her Dress of Heaven and remembering why he fought to survive for so long, he can stop clinging to life and die in peace.

 

 Kiritsugu's wife and Illyasviel‘s mother, a homunculus created by Jubstacheit von Einzbern as a vessel of the Holy Grail with knowledge and skills of her bloodline. Irisviel considered herself as a tool before meeting Kiritsugu, who taught her what it meant to be human before they married. During the Fourth Holy Grail War, Illyasviel posed as Saber's master so Kiritsugu can eliminate the other mages. She eventually dies and fulfills her intended purpose.

 

Tokiomi is the father of Rin and Sakura, an arrogant and manipulative mage who was Gilgamesh's master during the Fourth Holy Grail War. He arranges for Kirei Kotomine to be his understudy in magic and his support in the Holy Grail War. He thinks highly of Kotomine and has him serve in all manners of affairs, appointing him as Rin's guardian should trouble befall him. He is skilled in fire manipulation, and employs a large ruby set in the end of a staff as his Mystic Code to help him shape and control flame. While a skilled mage and confident in his abilities, he is actually one of the weakest Tohsaka in history and considers himself as inferior in potential to Rin and Sakura, who were both recognized by Tokiomi as possessing extraordinary abilities from birth. Though he and Kiritsugu never have any actual one-on-one engagements, the two are perfect foils for one another, as Kiritsugu is a tech-savvy spellcaster who puts his job as a father ahead of his job as a mage, while Tokiomi is a traditional mage who puts his identity as a mage before all else. He eventually meets his end when Kirei, who had been corrupted by Gilgamesh, stabs him in the back with an ornamental dagger Tokiomi had gifted Kirei with moments earlier. Kirei lies to Rin that her father was murdered by Kariya, giving her the dagger as a present, which ironically was later used to defeat Kirei in the Fate route.

Aoi is the mother of Rin and Sakura along with being the childhood friend of Kariya Matō. Though she is devastated by Tokiomi's decision to adopt away Sakura, she quietly accepts the decision due to the fact that she puts her position as the wife of a magus ahead of her position as a mother. She is tricked by Kotomine into believing Kariya had murdered Tokiomi out of jealousy, and declares that Kariya had "never loved anyone in his entire life" after the two get into a heated argument. This causes Kariya to finally snap and give in to his madness-fueled anger and lust. He strangles Aoi into unconsciousness in a fit of rage and gives her severe brain damage, leaving her both crippled and believing that her family is still whole. She dies sometime before the events of the original story.

Risei is Kirei Kotomine's 80-year-old father, a priest in the Church and the regulator of the 4th Holy Grail War. He is a friend of Tokiomi Tohsaka and actively supports him in a manner that borderlines on corruption. While he is proud of his son, who has demonstrated himself to be a perfect heir, Risei fails to understand Kirei in any sense. He is killed by Kayneth, but not before he is able to write a message in blood to Kirei about the location of the remaining command seals, which he uses in his final fight with Kiritsugu.

The Master of Rider and future Lord El-Melloi II, Waver steals his teacher's artifact early on and uses it to summon Iskandar during the Fourth Holy Grail War to force the Magus Association to recognize his genius. Despite his difficulties with Rider's overbearing nature, Waver and his Servant form a strong relationship. Though lacking in practical experience in the field of fighting in a war, Waver survives the Holy Grail War with little detriment to himself and develops a greater sense of perspective of the world, though he now harbors some bitterness towards Japan.

Maiya is an assistant to Kiritsugu Emiya. She is cold and professional, which makes it easier for Kiritsugu to act as he needs to. Maiya was originally a child soldier from a war-torn land who was rescued by Kiritsugu who taught her his way of life. Her real name is unknown; her current name was given to her by Kiritsugu when he first created false identity documents for her. Despite initial discomfort between them, she and Irisviel develop a mutual respect for one another out of their steadfast dedication to protect Kiritsugu. She is fatally wounded by Berserker (disguised as Rider) when she defends Irisviel and dies after she was joined by Kiritsugu. It was later revealed that she was raped in the past by an unknown soldier, resulting on her having a son who she never seen when an unknown government took him from her upon birth to be raised a soldier. Her son would later take on the name Sigma, who know little details about her mother and is one of the protagonists in Fate/strange fake.

Kariya is the uncle of Shinji Matō and Lancelot's master during the Fourth Holy Grail War. He is the only member of the Matō family who truly loves Sakura Matō like a daughter, and harbors a very strong grudge against Tokiomi, who allowed his younger child to be adopted by Zōken. Kariya had previously left the Matō family ten years prior to the 4th Holy Grail War out of disgust for his own family, but returns and makes a deal with Zōken Matō that he will win the Grail War in exchange for Sakura's freedom. He is in love with Aoi (his childhood friend), although he stepped down after she chose to marry Tokiomi instead. Due to his lack of formal training, Kariya was implanted with the same magical worms as Sakura. This caused a number of side effects as the worms would literally eat away at their host, causing Kariya's health to progressively fail in return for significantly expanding his magic circuits and magical potential. By the time of his summoning of a Servant, Kariya's hair had turned white and the nerves on the left side of his face were dead. In addition, his natural lifespan had been shortened to such an extent that Zōken estimated he would only live on for one additional year. However, despite the Crest Worms and his own accelerated training, Kariya remained severely lacking as a Magus. At Zōken's behest, he compensated for this by summoning the most powerful of the seven Servant classes, the Servant of Mad Enhancement, Berserker. However, the high volume of magical energy required to maintain Berserker causes him frequent, severe pain. He dies after exhausting his energy and passes away while dreaming of Aoi, Rin, Sakura, and the life he wished he could have had with them.

 Ryūnosuke is Bluebeard's master, a highly deranged serial killer who summons the Caster class servant after murdering a family and using their blood as a component in the summoning ritual. He does not seek the Holy Grail, but follows Bluebeard in order to find macabre ways to kill people and relieve his boredom, using a hypnotic charm to lure children to their deaths. But Ryūnosuke does admit that he does in fact feel that there is something missing from his life and that, on some level, he desires to find it through his atrocities. He eventually becomes the primary antagonist of the first season, as the entire war is put on hold so as to stop his and Bluebeard's rampage. He is killed by Kiritsugu with shot to the stomach and then the head, having a realization the interval between the bullets that the "thing" he had been searching for his whole life was his own death.

The Master of Diarmuid Ua Duibhne, Kayneth is a nobleman from the Magus Association, Lord of the House of El-Melloi and a prodigy at magecraft, said to be the most talented participant in the Holy Grail War. His artifact is stolen by his pupil, Waver Velvet, but he manages to obtain another artifact and summon Diarmuid instead. While he holds the command spells for his Lancer, the energy to materialize the Servant is maintained by Sola-Ui. Despite his skill, Kayneth's overly-traditional approach to combat causes him to underestimate his opponents' capacity for violence, as he believes that the Holy Grail War will be fought with honorable duels and tests of skill rather than quick blitzkriegs like those perpetrated by Kiritsugu and Kotomine. He is confident in his abilities and takes pride in his heritage, but finds the extent of Kiritsugu's untraditional and underhanded tactics both offensive and unexpectedly challenging to overcome. He loses his ability to use magecraft after being shot by Kiritsugu's Origin Bullet and is left half-blind and crippled. Sola-Ui then steals his Command Seals to make Lancer hers. After being forced to make Diarmuid commit suicide, he and Sola-Ui are sniped by Maiya so as to tie up any loose ends and avoid future retribution from the Archibald family. Kayneth is then killed by Saber as an act of mercy.

The daughter of the head of the spiritual evocation division, Sola-Ui is engaged to Kayneth as a result of a strategic marriage arrangement and the decision of her family to entrust their crest to her brother instead.  However, she is coldhearted and does not reciprocate Kayneth's love for her; instead, she becomes infatuated with Diarmuid, who in turn does not reciprocate her feelings and regards her only as his Master's wife. After Kayneth loses his magecraft abilities, Sola-Ui eventually steals his Command Seals by breaking his fingers until he gives them to her, only to lose them when Maiya cuts off her arm. She is used by Kiritsugu as a bargaining chip against Kayneth to force Diarmuid to commit suicide, and is then shot dead by Maiya.

 - 

The first hostile Servant to appear in the Fifth Holy Grail War. His true identity is Cú Chulainn, the "child of light" from Ireland and one of its most famed heroes. He has a playful attitude and takes a carefree approach to life but quickly works himself into a frenzy during a heated battle. When activated, it reverses the laws of cause and effect, meaning that the fact that the next strike will hit the opponent's heart becomes a foregone conclusion, even before the spear is thrust. This causes its next strike to become completely unavoidable and fatal, ignoring all magical and physical protection, bending at impossible angles and around obstacles. The only way to survive this technique is to be blessed with a large degree of luck to have the spear strike a region other than the heart, as avoiding the blow is impossible. In the Unlimited Blade Works route, he also uses , which maximizes Gáe Bolg's true capabilities as a thrown weapon.

In the Fate route, his death is not seen. His death is portrayed in Studio Deen's anime adaptation of the Fate route as being the result of Gilgamesh. In the Unlimited Blade Works route, he offers to temporarily become allies with Shirō and Rin after Caster steals Saber and Archer betrays Rin to join her, becoming the pair's subsidiary Servant. Lancer discovers Kirei's hand in the mess when the Priest explains he'd manipulated the events to his advantage, intending to use Rin as the vessel for the Holy Grail. He then collapses from a fatal wound after being ordered to commit suicide via Command Spell, but not before killing Kirei and stabbing Shinji Matō. He then sets fire to the Einzbern castle with magic before fading away. In the Heaven's Feel route, Lancer dies early on, being killed by True Assassin.

 - 

The Servant of Illya, who appears as a giant with adamantine skin and gross brawn. His true identity is Heracles, a legendary hero and demigod of Greece and the son of the Ruler of the Gods, Zeus. He wields a colossal axe-sword, and is capable of causing massive destruction with the mere backlash of his swings. Berserkers are praised as members of the "Strongest" class, though they are difficult to control and can turn on their Masters. Berserker also possess a Noble Phantasm called , which is the legendary bow and arrow set used by Heracles to slay the nine-headed Hydra. In the anime and the "Fate" route of the visual novel, Shirō and Saber perform a joint special attack with a traced Caliburn, Saber's lost Noble Phantasm, and kill him. In the Unlimited Blade Works route, Gilgamesh binds the Servant down with his divine chains and pelts him with weapons, removing all his lives and killing him. In the "Heaven's Feel" route, Berserker is defeated by Saber Alter - the corrupted form of Saber - and is then consumed by Angra Mainyu and reborn as the decrepit Dark Berserker. He is later killed by Shirō Emiya.

 (Japanese), David Vincent (Fate/stay night, UBW film), Todd Haberkorn (UBW TV) (English)
A solitary Servant, clothed in a traditional Japanese hakama and kimono with an indigo haori. He carries an odachi as his main weapon. He initially claims to be , but in reality he is a nameless samurai "who forged his past and is a master swordsman only in people's memories". He was summoned by Caster as a guardian and watchman for the front gate of the Ryūdō Temple. As an improper servant, Assassin is entirely dependent on Caster for mana and cannot move freely beyond the grounds of Ryūdō Temple. Because of his limited status, Assassin only seeks to enjoy a decent sword fight. It is a sword skill of the highest degree that requires no mana other than that needed for Assassin to move, and as such is incredibly efficient. It is a sure-kill move, although in a different sense from Gáe Bolg. In Fate/Hollow ataraxia, he is described as having been killed by Gilgamesh. In the Unlimited Blade Works route, he faces Saber once after letting Shirō and Archer pass to let them cause inconvenience for Caster, later letting Saber leave with her Master after Archer wounds Shirō as a sign of respect for her abilities and desire to defend her comrade. Saber defeats him on the last night of the Holy Grail War. In Heaven's Feel route, Assassin's flesh serves as Zōken Matō's catalyst for summoning True Assassin, with the latter bursting out from within his flesh.

 - 

She is an honored guest of the Ryūdō family, permitted to live at their temple until the preparations for her marriage have been finalized. Her true identity is Medea, the disgraced princess of Colchis who was branded a witch due to actions outside her control. Unlike other Servants, she does not wield a weapon for physical combat, but her rank allows her to manipulate Mana and perform magic like a wizard, which other Servants cannot do. Her magical ability far surpasses modern Magi, due to her technique, . This allows her to cast spells that would normally take minutes to cast by uttering a single word. Because of her Magus ability, she has a dual role as a Servant to Kuzuki and a Master of Assassin. Its greatest use is in severing the bond between Master and Servant. She also possesses a Noble Phantasm called , a coat of golden fleece which is capable of summoning the original Colchis dragon that guarded it after it is thrown upon the ground. However, she is not capable of using it in the Fifth Holy Grail War.

In the Fifth Holy Grail War, shortly after her summoning, she kills her original Master Atram Galiast within a few days, and is later taken in by her current Master Sōichirō Kuzuki at the Ryūdō Temple. Caster quickly fell in love with Sōichirō, for he was the first man to show her genuine kindness, dedication, and loyalty. Her primary objective shifted from obtaining the Holy Grail for herself to simply preserving their short time together. To that end, she takes the souls of other beings to sustain herself and strengthen her defensive power, as Kuzuki is incapable of providing her with Mana. In the anime-original storyline, she kidnaps Sakura by possessing her body and stabbing Saber with Rule Breaker, but, because of Saber's A-ranked magic resistance, she was only able to take away Saber's ability to use her Noble Phantasm. She then tries to sacrifice Sakura, who has latent Magus abilities, to summon the Holy Grail directly. She is then defeated by Gilgamesh's Gate of Babylon in her underground city. In the Fate route, she is defeated by Gilgamesh's Gate of Babylon while attempting to attack the Emiya household. In the Unlimited Blade Works route, she is the primary antagonist of the first third of the path. She personally stabs Saber with Rule Breaker, turning her into her Servant for a short time, but is later betrayed and defeated by Archer. In the Heaven's Feel route, she is killed by Saber early on after losing Assassin and Kuzuki in an attack by the Shadow. Still, Zōken Matō uses one of his worm familiars to maintain her body as a puppet for a brief period before Saber slays it. Her Rule Breaker would play a critical role later, being projected by Shirou to sever Sakura's connection to The Shadow.

  - 

The First of the Knights of Fianna, Lancer possesses a love spot on his face, which causes females with insufficient magic resistance to fall in love with him should they gaze upon it. As a knight, he adheres to a code of honour in battle and a sense of loyalty to his master, being summoned to fight in the Fourth Holy Grail War because he wants to display the loyalty to his lord that he was not able to show when he was alive. Despite being enemies, he and Saber share mutual respect for each other, and he considers it his duty to take her head, protecting her and aiding her on multiple occasions, in an attempt to ensure that he will be the one to kill her. Lancer fights at Mion river with the other heroic spirits, where he is forced to break one of his spears, Gae Buidhe, in order to allow the wound he inflicted upon Saber to heal so that she can use her noble phantasm, Excalibur, to destroy Caster. Later that day, during a one-on-one duel with Saber, Lancer is forced to commit suicide by Kayneth, and dies cursing his master, Sola-Ui, Kiritsugu, Saber, and the Grail for destroying his pride and last remaining wish.

  - 

 Iskandar, the King of Conquerors, famous in history as Alexander the Great, appears during the Fourth Holy Grail War to seek reincarnation and resume his conquest of the world. While he initially respected Saber, Iskandar considered her ideals regarding kingship are delusional and that she would thrive as one of his followers. His eccentric and overbearing personality along with his incredible abilities creates difficulties for his Master and their opponents. He is also the only Servant that Gilgamesh truly respects as an equal, the latter inviting him to challenge him in combat as many times as he wished. He is killed by Gilgamesh in single combat and, in his dying moments, finally finds Oceanus, the place he had searched for all his life.

  - ,

Commonly known as Bluebeard, his real name is Gilles de Rais - a comrade of Jeanne d'Arc whose death drove him insane as he spent his final years dabbling in the occult becoming a serial killer of children. Deriving pleasure from giving his victims a false sense of hope before killing them, Rais entered the Fourth Holy Grail War to revive Jeanne. But he mistook Saber for an amnesiac Jeanne and assumed he already won the war, proceeding to go on a killing spree with Ryūnosuke that forces the war to be placed on hold until they are eliminated. Following Ryūnosuke restoring the Caster's faith in God with his twisted perception of humanity's relation to the divine as entertainment, Rais decides to give God a show with his Noble Phantasm. Following Ryūnosuke's death, Rais is obliterated by Saber's Excalibur.
Among its spells include summoning otherworldly monsters known as Horrors. The strength of his Noble Phantasm helps make up for his otherwise average ability in magecraft. A Saber variant of Rais appears in Fate/Apocrypha.

  - 

Previously known as the Black Knight, Berserker is a Servant during the Fourth Holy Grail War who possesses the ability to use practically any object as a Noble Phantasm, allowing him to match Gilgamesh in combat. His madness has reduced him to a mindless, though dangerously skilled, fighter. Despite his insanity, he is still able to instinctively recognize Saber. When Saber finally learns Berserker's true identity, she is devastated that her decisions in life and her adherence to chivalry had caused her friend such suffering even after dying. During the battle it is revealed that his insanity stems from his overwhelming desire to be punished for his adultery with Guinevere and his own subconscious love for Saber, his sanity being eaten away as he was forced to watch the love of his life throw away her humanity for the sake of her people. He is killed by Saber as he is about to deal her a killing blow when his Master runs out of magical energy midway, and regains his sanity in his dying moments. His death almost drives Saber into darkness, as she becomes hellbent on gaining the Grail by any means.
By use of a Command Spell, it is possible to use the fog to allow Berserker to mimic another's appearance, although it is noted that had Lancelot been summoned under a different Class, he would be able to freely disguise at will. , allows him to turn anything he recognizes as a weapon, into a D-ranked Noble Phantasm. If he grabs hold of others' Noble Phantasms, he claims them temporarily as his own and their original rank is retained, making it the perfect counter to Archer's attacks. His last Noble Phantasm,  is a magical sword which, when drawn, dispels For Someone's Glory and Knight of Honor, boosts all his parameters and grants him additional prowess against beings with a 'dragon' attribute such as Saber.

 

 A group of servants who are reincarnations of Assassin Order leaders who took the name of Hassan-i Sabbah, having served in the Holy Grail War since it began.
 The Hassan-i Sabbāh in the Fourth War, an Assassin class in service to Kotomine as a spy for Tokimi's faction, is known as  whose self-inflicted dissociative identity disorder allowed him to manifest his alters into separate bodies through his Noble Phantasm . They were ultimately sacrificial pawns with the first Hassan killed by Gilgamesh while the rest were slaughtered by Iskandar's Noble Phantasm.
 The Hassan-i Sabbāh that appears in the Heaven's Feel route of the Fifth War is a servant that Zōken Matō summoned by sacrificing Kojirō. True Assassin's battles Saber and traps her between his Noble Phantasm and The Shadow, resulting in her being devoured by the latter and her subsequent corruption into Saber Alter. He attempts to kill Shirō immediately after but is defeated by Rider, who comes to Shirō's defense at the behest of her true master - revealed later to be Sakura Matō. He is later slain by Sakura's Shadow when Sakura turns on Zōken as revenge for his years of tormenting her.

 
 A Servant who was formerly a villager from ancient times who was driven mad from being sacrificed to a torturous ritual after being selected as "source of all evil in the world", losing his identity consumed by his growing hatred towards humanity while becoming a Heroic Spirit as his forced sacrifice eased his peoples' state of mind. Angra Mainyu was made a Servant during the Third Holy Grail War by the Einzbern family with the rare class of Avenger yet lacked the fighting strength of the other servants before being defeated and absorbed into the Holy Grail, corrupting it while turned into monstrous being whose existence influenced the following wars in the form of black mud.
 During the events of Fate/Zero, invested in Kiritsugu Emiya due to their similar ideas, Angra Mainyu assimilated the form and memories of the deceased Irisviel and speak to Kiritsugu as the Greater Grail materializes. But Kritsugu rejects Angra Mainyu and is cursed while attempting to destroy the Holy Grail, the Avenger reviving Kirei and giving Gilgamesh a physical body while also tormenting Illya and providing Zouken with fragments of the Grail that were placed in Sakura's body.
 Angra Mainyu makes his presence known in the end of the three routes through the machinations of Kirei, Gilgamesh, and Zouken.
 - 

The First of the Knights of Fianna, Lancer possesses a love spot on his face, which causes females with insufficient magic resistance to fall in love with him should they gaze upon it. As a knight, he adheres to a code of honour in battle and a sense of loyalty to his master, being summoned to fight in the grail war because he wants to display the loyalty to his lord that he was not able to show when he was alive.  Despite being enemies, he and Saber share mutual respect for each other, and he considers it his duty to take her head, protecting her and aiding her on multiple occasions, in an attempt to ensure that he will be the one to kill her. Lancer fights at Mion river with the other heroic spirits, where he is forced to break one of his spears, Gae Buidhe, in order to allow the wound he inflicted upon Saber to heal so that she can use her noble phantasm, Excalibur, to destroy Caster. Later that day, during a one-on-one duel with Saber, Lancer is forced to commit suicide by Kayneth, and dies cursing his master, Sola-Ui, Kiritsugu, Saber, and the Grail for destroying his pride and last remaining wish.

  - 

Rider's identity is Iskander, the King of Conquerors, famous in history as Alexander the Great, who desires to defeat Saber in particular because he believes her ideals regarding kingship are delusional and that she would thrive as one of his followers. His eccentric and overbearing personality along with his incredible abilities creates difficulties for his Master and their opponents. He is also the only Servant that Gilgamesh truly respects as an equal, the latter inviting him to challenge him in combat as many times as he wished. His wish is for a second life and he plans to wage war against the United States to celebrate his revival, believing they will pose an enjoyable challenge. He is killed by Gilgamesh in single combat and, in his dying moments, finally finds Oceanus, the place he had searched for all his life.

  - ,

Commonly known as Bluebeard, his real name is Gilles de Rais - a mass serial killer who seems to favour killing children in particular. Caster is a fiendish Servant who derives pleasure from first providing his victims a moment of relief before terrorizing them and then killing them. He expresses an obsessive interest in Saber because he has mistaken her for Jeanne d'Arc, his former comrade and the protagonist of Fate/Apocrypha, with whom Bluebeard has an infatuation. As his wish for the Grail was for her to be resurrected, Caster becomes convinced he has won the War and repeatedly tries to talk to Saber; when she subsequently tries correcting him, he believes that she has lost her memories by God's intervention, much to his rage. He has, by far, the best relationship with his master of any servant. He sees Ryūnosuke as a prophet who preaches that God is a sadistic yet loving being that enjoys seeing His creations commit horrific acts, as He wouldn't have made the human race so violent and their organs so colorful if He did not enjoy chaos. This restores Caster's faith in God and he decides to put on a show for Him, to show Him that He isn't the only "entertainer" who can put on a show. The war is eventually postponed due to the duo's rampage, as Caster and Ryūnosuke had begun to murder hordes of children in hopes of catching God's attention and forcing Him to "return" Saber's non-existent memories of being Jeanne. Following Ryūnosuke's death, Caster is obliterated by Saber's Excalibur.
The strength of his Noble Phantasm helps make up for his otherwise average ability in magecraft.

  - 

Previously known as the Black Knight, Berserker is a Servant who possesses the ability to use practically any object as a Noble Phantasm, allowing him to match Gilgamesh in combat. His madness has reduced him to a mindless, though dangerously skilled, fighter. Despite his insanity, he is still able to instinctively recognize Saber. When Saber finally learns Berserker's true identity, she is devastated that her decisions in life and her adherence to chivalry had caused her friend such suffering even after dying. During the battle it is revealed that his insanity stems from his overwhelming desire to be punished for his adultery with Guinevere and his own subconscious love for Saber, his sanity being eaten away as he was forced to watch the love of his life throw away her humanity for the sake of her people. He is killed by Saber as he is about to deal her a killing blow when his Master runs out of magical energy midway, and regains his sanity in his dying moments. His death almost drives Saber into darkness, as she becomes hellbent on gaining the Grail by any means.
By use of a Command Spell, it is possible to use the fog to allow Berserker to mimic another's appearance, although it is noted that had Lancelot been summoned under a different Class, he would be able to freely disguise at will. , allows him to turn anything he recognizes as a weapon, into a D-ranked Noble Phantasm. If he grabs hold of others' Noble Phantasms, he claims them temporarily as his own and their original rank is retained, making it the perfect counter to Archer's attacks. His last Noble Phantasm,  is a magical sword which, when drawn, dispels For Someone's Glory and Knight of Honor, boosts all his parameters and grants him additional prowess against beings with a 'dragon' attribute such as Saber.

  - 

Assassin is actually the reincarnation of the head of the Assassin Order. While every Assassin in every Grail War thus recorded has shared the same name of Hassan-i Sabbāh, they are different persons as all the leaders of the Assassin Order changed their names to Hassan-i Sabbāh upon ascending to the position.
The Hassan-i Sabbāh in the Fourth War became head by intentionally fracturing his psyche during life to confuse opponents, a form of self-inflicted dissociative identity disorder. When summoned as a Servant, this ability manifests itself as the Noble Phantasm , which splits his body into up to eighty different entities, sharing his spiritual potential amongst them. They act as reconnaissance agents for Tokiomi and Kirei after Gilgamesh "kills" one of them. Assassin can only be truly defeated if all of them are killed, which they are after being massacred by Rider's Ionian Hetairoi.

Minor characters
 

Tokiomi is the father of Rin Tohsaka and Sakura Matou, Master of Archer, and an arrogant and manipulative mage. He arranges for Kirei Kotomine to be his understudy in magic and his support in the Holy Grail War. He thinks highly of Kotomine and has him serve in all manners of affairs, appointing him as Rin's guardian should trouble befall him. He is skilled in fire manipulation, and employs a large ruby set in the end of a staff as his Mystic Code to help him shape and control flame. While a skilled mage and confident in his abilities, he is actually one of the weakest Tohsaka in history and considers himself as inferior in potential to Rin and Sakura, who were both recognized by Tokiomi as possessing extraordinary abilities from birth. Though he and Kiritsugu never have any actual one-on-one engagements, the two are perfect foils for one another, as Kiritsugu is a tech-savvy spellcaster who puts his job as a father ahead of his job as a mage, while Tokiomi is a traditional mage who puts his identity as a mage before all else. He eventually meets his end when Kirei, who had been corrupted by Gilgamesh, stabs him in the back with an ornamental dagger Tokiomi had gifted Kirei with moments earlier. Kirei lies to Rin that her father was murdered by Kariya, giving her the dagger as a present.

Aoi is the mother of Rin Tohsaka and Sakura Matou as well as the childhood friend of Kariya Matou.  Though she is devastated by Tokiomi's decision to give Sakura away, she quietly accepts the decision due to the fact that she puts her position as the wife of a mage ahead of her position as a mother. She is tricked by Kotomine into believing Kariya had murdered Tokiomi out of jealousy, and declares that Kariya had "never loved anyone in his entire life" after the two get into a heated argument. This causes Kariya to finally snap and give in to his madness-fueled anger and lust. He strangles Aoi into unconsciousness in a fit of rage and gives her severe brain damage, leaving her both crippled and believing that her family is still whole. She dies sometime before the events of the original story.

Risei is Kirei Kotomine's 80-year-old father, a priest in the Church and the Overseer of the 4th Holy Grail War. He is a friend of Tokiomi Tohsaka and actively supports him in a manner that borderlines on corruption. While he is proud of his son, who has demonstrated himself to be a perfect heir, Risei fails to understand Kirei in any sense. He is killed by Kayneth, but not before he is able to write a message in blood to Kirei about the location of the remaining Command seals, which he uses in his final fight against Kiritsugu.

The Master of Rider and future Lord El-Melloi II, Waver steals his teacher's artifact early on and uses it to summon Rider. He plans to use the Grail to force the Mages' Association to recognize his genius. Despite his difficulties with Rider's overbearing nature, Waver and his Servant form a strong relationship.  Though lacking in practical experience in the field of fighting in a war, Waver, mostly due to his Servant, survives the Holy Grail War with little detriment to himself and develops a greater sense of perspective of the world, though he now harbors some bitterness towards Japan.

Maiya is an assistant and mistress to Kiritsugu Emiya. She is cold and professional, which makes it easier for Kiritsugu to act as he needs to. Maiya was originally a child soldier from a war-torn land who was rescued by Kiritsugu who taught her his way of life. Her real name is unknown; her current name was given to her by Kiritsugu when he first created false identity documents for her. Despite initial discomfort between them, she and Irisviel develop a mutual respect for one another out of their steadfast dedication to protect Kiritsugu. She is fatally wounded by Berserker (disguised as Rider) when she defends Irisviel and dies after she was joined by Kiritsugu. It was later revealed that she was raped in the past by an unknown soldier, resulting in her having a son whom she had never seen when an unknown government took him from her upon birth to be raised as a soldier. Her son would later take on the name Sigma, and is one of the protagonists in Fate/strange fake.

A freelance mercenary who sold information concerning Noritaka Emiya and his research on vampires. She rescues a young Kiritsugu after the latter kills his father and takes him as her apprentice. During her last mission, she is able to successfully kill a magus that could turn humans into ghouls through magic, but is killed when Kiritsugu shoots down the plane she is on to prevent the infected passengers from killing others when the plane landed. Kiritsugu's last words to her reveal that he viewed her as his mother.

Kariya is the uncle of Shinji Matō and Master of Berserker. He is the only member of the Matō family who truly loves Sakura Matou like a daughter, and harbors a very strong grudge against Tokiomi, who allowed his younger child to be adopted by Zouken. Kariya had previously left the Matou family ten years prior to the 4th Holy Grail War out of disgust for his own family, but returns and makes a deal with Zouken that he will win the Grail War in exchange for Sakura's freedom. He is in love with Aoi (his childhood friend), although he stepped down after she chose to marry Tokiomi instead. Due to his lack of formal training, Kariya was implanted with the same magical worms as Sakura. This caused a number of side effects as the worms would literally eat away at their host, causing Kariya's health to progressively fail in return for significantly expanding his magic circuits and magical potential. By the time of his summoning of a Servant, Kariya's hair had turned white and the nerves on the left side of his face were dead. In addition, his natural lifespan had been shortened to such an extent that Zōken estimated he would only live on for one additional year. However, despite the Crest Worms and his own accelerated training, Kariya remained severely lacking as a mage. At Zouken's behest, he compensated for this by summoning the most powerful of the seven Servant classes, the Servant of Mad Enhancement, Berserker. However, the high volume of magical energy required to maintain Berserker causes him frequent, severe pain. He dies after exhausting his energy and passes away while dreaming of Aoi, Rin, Sakura, and the life he wished he could have had with them.

 Ryūnosuke is the Master of Caster and a highly deranged serial killer who summons Caster after murdering a family and using their blood as a component in the summoning ritual.  He does not seek the Holy Grail, but follows Caster in order to find macabre ways to kill people and relieve his boredom, using a hypnotic charm to lure children to their deaths. However, Ryūnosuke does admit that he does in fact feel that there is something missing from his life and that, on some level, he desires to find it through his atrocities. He eventually becomes the primary antagonist of the first season, as the entire war is put on hold so as to stop his and Caster's rampage. He is killed by Kiritsugu, who shoots him in the stomach and head. Ryūnosuke does, however, die content with his life after seeing his first bullet wound and commenting on the beauty of his blood and intestines spilling out, having realized that the "thing" he had been searching for his whole life was his own death.

 and 

These two women are Illya's maids, but they act as her caretakers and instruct her in the secrets of sorcery. Like Illya, they both have silky white hair and deep crimson eyes. Sella is rather inconsistent and insecure (especially regarding her body) and suspicious of Shirō Emiya. In contrast, Leysritt is far more casual and affectionate for Shirō because his presence makes Illya happy. Leysritt is skilled in combat, particularly with halberds.

A stellar athlete and captain of the archery dojo. Ayako and Rin are actively competing to see who will be the first to snag a boyfriend. She is close friends with Shirō, despite her outgoing and extroverted attitude making him uncomfortable, and wishes to see Shirō smile, something she has never seen him do. She is victimized by Rider or Caster early in the story and later found unconscious in an alleyway. In the anime, Ayako is seen with Shinji after her disappearance, although Shinji denies it when asked by Shirō. Ayako often asks Shirō to come to the archery dojo and watch them practice. After she is attacked, Ayako is said to be recovering in hospital but is not seen again.

Yukika is the gentle manager of the Track Team, warmly loved by most of her class. She is one of the few people able to see Assassin at the Ryūdō Temple gate and strikes up a conversation with him in Fate/hollow ataraxia.

Kaede is a beautiful but loud and obnoxious sprinter known as the Panther of Homura. A friend of Rin Tōsaka, the two often go window-shopping together. Her hobby is collecting wind chimes.

Kane is one of Yukika and Kaede's friends, a high jumper, and is also the protagonist of Fate/School Life. She is considerate and intelligent. She has feelings for Shirō. Her father is the mayor of Fuyuki City. Her hobby is painting.

Otoko is Shirō's employer, and owner of a liquor store, The Copenhagen Bar. She dislikes her given name, Otoko (phonically identical to the Japanese word for "male"), preferring to be called "Neko". She feels attached to Shirō and always addresses him by a pet name, "Emi-yan". "Neko" considers Taiga to be a bad influence on her hard-working employee.

Better known as the grandfather of Taiga, Raiga is the Oyabun (組長 family head) of a yakuza group operating in Fuyuki City. He was an old friend of Kiritsugu Emiya, and as a favor, managed Kiritsugu's estate after his death in place of Shirō. Due to Taiga's general incompetence, he is also Shirō's de facto guardian, and often takes Shirō hunting or to sumo matches, paying him for his time.

Zelretch is one of five living sorcerers capable of "True Magic." Zelretch's particular miracle is known as the "Kaleidoscope," which gives him dominion over the unlimited alternate realities. Originally introduced in Tsukihime, he makes a cameo appearance in the Heaven's Feel scenario of Fate/stay night as Rin's magus teacher. The Jeweled Sword Zelretch featured in the same route is his creation.

A descendant of the Edelfelt family, who participated in the Third Holy Grail War with twin Masters, believing it would be advantageous for them to have two Servants due to their Crest being split in half, though the family has not participated since. Luvia is an outstanding but arrogant student at the Mage's Association and frequently fights with other students, including Rin Tōsaka, her cousin. She is notably famous in the non-magical world due to her job as a professional wrestler, where she is known as the "Forklift Lady" due to her immense strength. Her powers are similar to Rin's.  Luvia's first proper appearance is in Fate/hollow ataraxia where she is Shirō's partner and admirer, working with him to investigate mysterious magical incidents on behalf of the Mage's Association. She was later seen in the final episode of the anime series adaptation of Unlimited Blade Works, once again as a fellow student to Rin and Shirō with her affections for the latter and rivalry with the former intact.

Known as the Saint of Winter, Justeaze was a homunculus whose family desired the Holy Grail long before the Holy Grail Wars began.  When their attempts continued to fail, the Einzbern reluctantly accepted the aid of the Tōsaka and Makiri (Matō) families, and under the guidance of Zelretch, they formed the Holy Grail Wars. Justeaze agreed to form the core of the Holy Grail; as such, her descendants (Illyasviel von Einzbern and her mother, Irisviel) each contain within their parts of Justeaze's memories and personality as well as a genetic resemblance to her. She also indirectly assists her adoptive descendant Shirō, as it is through her memories that he is able to create a copy of the Jeweled Sword Zelretch near the climax of Heaven's Feel. She is also the cause of Zōken's actions in Heaven's Feel, as Zōken (back when he was still Zolgen) had decided to use the Grail to create world peace as a tribute to his lost love, but eventually forgot due to his ever-advancing age and creeping insanity.

The former Master of Caster who was originally mentioned in the visual novel, until his actual appearance in the second anime adaptation of Unlimited Blade Works in which his role was explained. Atrum initially summoned Caster to take advantage of her ability to summon the original dragon of Colchis. However, once Caster stated that while she indeed had the knowledge to summon said dragon but not on how to control it, Atrum dismisses Caster as useless.

One of the Knights of the Round Table, Bedivere, is Altria's caretaker and one of the stewards of the royal court. Only appearing in the final scenes in the Fate Route, he came to serve the young king out of admiration, entrusting his sword to her and working to become her guard. As the years passed up to her passing in the Battle of Camlann, he tended to her in her final moments in her life. He was happy that he finally saw his wish for her: a peaceful sleep that she had never been able to obtain. Happy that he thanked someone another time for giving her peace, he watches over her and asks her if she's watching the continuation of her dream.
Bedivere played a major role in the 6th chapter of Fate/Grand Order as a summonable Saber-class servant in both game and the movie adaptation.

Reception

The visual novel noted that such use of the heroes of the legends of antiquity could also encourage acquaintance with their original sources. Uno Tsunehiro from Kyoto University compared Shirou's traumatic background in regards the city's fire to survivors from the September 11 attacks while also showing different ways the Japanese society used to take care of their lives in such time. As a result, Tsunehiro views Shirou's change in each route as a way to recover from the trauma, grow up and become an independent person. A large number of sudden deaths, coupled with a sharp effect of losing control over the situation, according to the authors of the monograph, gave the gameplay an additional emotional coloring and motivated players to continue playing the game, aided by well-developed plot twists. In his analysis of the magical system and details of the personalities of the characters, Makoto Kuroda sees in the idea of Shirou to become a “champion of justice” a direct analogy with the traditional view of the life of bodhisattvas in Mahayana Buddhism, seeking to save other people at the cost of their own efforts and suffering. In Kuroda's view, Buddhist concepts are opposed to the elements of Christian ethics contained in the plot through the opposition of Shirou and Kirei Kotomine in the form of the main character's rejection of the interpretation of Angra Mainyu as a creature who accepted the sins of others in the name of salvation.

The images of Rin, Saber and Sakura received conflicting ratings. Thus, many reviewers recognized that the psychologically deepest arc is "Heaven's Feel", which is largely due to the sharp and versatile disclosure of the image of Sakura Matou, and her romantic line with Shirou is the most "adult" among all the heroines. Some reviewers commented on Shirou's relationship with Saber and on his growth in Studio Deen's anime that improves their personalities and adds romance to their relationship as the plot progresses.

Kirtisugu's relationship with Kirei was the subject of praise.  The Fandom Post and Blu-ray enjoyed Shirou's characterization in the film, in which his ideals contrast with those of Archer and Kiritusgu, making him notably mature in the story.

References

 
Fate stay night